Outside the Box is a comedy club located in the backroom of The Fighting Cocks pub in Kingston-upon-Thames. It was opened in November 2006 by comedian Maff Brown.

Three months after attending a comedy course in the summer of 2006, Brown established the club in order to test his own material before taking it around the comedy circuit.

Over the years, the comedy club has extended to various locations in and around London, and there are now regular shows in Kingston-upon-Thames, Sevenoaks, Hampton, Surbiton and Windsor

The club is currently used by celebrity comedians to road test newly written work. Notable comics who have performed include:

The Kingston club holds 80 people and runs on a weekly basis. All other nights, such as the Sevenoaks club, hold 300-400 people but run monthly.

Awards
Chortle Awards 2005 Best London Venue (Small)
The Guardian The 4th Best Comedy Club in the UK

External links
 Outside The Box
 Chortle Listings
 Time Out London
 The Guardian

Culture in London
Comedy clubs in the United Kingdom
Entertainment venues in London